Wang Kaphi railway station is a railway station located in Wang Kaphi Subdistrict, Uttaradit City, Uttaradit. It is located 476.822 km from Bangkok railway station and is a class 3 railway station. It is on the Northern Line of the State Railway of Thailand.

Train services
 Local 403 Phitsanulok-Sila At
 Local 407/408 Nakhon Sawan-Chiang Mai-Nakhon Sawan
 Local 410 Sila At-Phitsanulok

References 

 
 

Railway stations in Thailand